Discrete papular lichen myxedematosus is a skin condition caused by fibroblasts producing abnormally large amounts of mucopolysaccharides characterized by the occurrence of waxy, flesh-colored papules.

See also 
 Papular mucinosis
 List of cutaneous conditions

References

External links 

Mucinoses